This list of ancient Greek philosophers contains philosophers who studied in ancient Greece or spoke Greek. Ancient Greek philosophy began in Miletus with the pre-Socratic philosopher Thales and lasted through Late Antiquity. Some of the most famous and influential philosophers of all time were from the ancient Greek world, including Socrates, Plato and Aristotle.

↵Abbreviations used in this list:

c. = circa
fl. = flourished

See also
List of ancient Platonists
List of Cynic philosophers
List of Epicurean philosophers
List of Stoic philosophers

References

External links
 "Greek philosophy" at the Internet Encyclopedia of Philosophy
 "Presocratic philosophy" at the Stanford Encyclopedia of Philosophy

Philosophers
 
Philosophers
ancient Greek philosophers